Erlanger v New Sombrero Phosphate Co (1878) 3 App Cas 1218 is a landmark English contract law, restitution and UK company law case. It concerned rescission for misrepresentation and how the impossibility of counter restitution may be a bar to rescission. It is also an important illustration of how promoters of a company stand in a fiduciary relationship to subscribers.

Facts
Frédéric Émile d'Erlanger was a Parisian banker. He bought the lease of the Anguilla island of Sombrero for phosphate mining for £55,000. He then set up the New Sombrero Phosphate Co. Eight days after incorporation, he sold the island to the company for £110,000 through a nominee. One of the directors was the Lord Mayor of London, who himself was independent of the syndicate that formed the company. Two other directors were abroad, and the others were mere puppet directors of Erlanger. The board, which was effectively Erlanger, ratified the sale of the lease. Erlanger, through promotion and advertising, got many members of the public to invest in the company.

After eight months, the public investors found out the fact that Erlanger (and his syndicate) had bought the island at half the price the company (now with their money) had paid for it. The New Sombrero Phosphate Co sued for rescission based on non-disclosure, if they gave back the mine and an account of profits, or for the difference.

Judgment
The House of Lords unanimously held that promoters of a company stand in a fiduciary relationship to investors, meaning they have a duty of disclosure. Further, they held, by majority (Lord Cairns LC dissenting), that the contract could be rescinded, and that  rescission was not barred by laches.

Lord Blackburn decided that delay did not bar rescission. As a general "condition to a rescission there must be a restitutio in integrum." There was a question over this, since phosphate had been mined, and it was not so easy to put the phosphate back. He observed it would "be obviously unjust that a person who has been in possession of property under the contract which he seeks to repudiate should be allowed to throw that back on the other party’s hands without accounting for any benefit he may have derived from the use of the property… [or] making compensation for that deterioration." In this case, however, adequate compensate could be paid. So there was no impossibility in counter restitution. His judgment ran as follows.

Lord Penzance, Lord Hatherley, Lord O'Hagan, Lord Selborne and Lord Gordon concurred.

See also

English unjust enrichment
Lambert v Co-operative Insurance Society Ltd [1975] 2 Lloyd’s Rep 485

American cases
Smith v. Bolles, 132 U.S. 125 (1889) damages for misrepresentation of share sale did not entitle the buyer to get money as if the representation were true

Notes

References
 A Burrows, J Edelman and E McKendrick, Cases and Materials on the Law of Restitution (2nd Ed, OUP, Oxford, 2007)

English unjust enrichment case law
English misrepresentation case law
1878 in case law
Lord Blackburn cases
1878 in British law
United Kingdom company case law
House of Lords cases